The 2014 Women's Knockout Cup was New Zealand's women's 21st knockout football competition.

The 2014 competition had four rounds before the quarter-finals, semi-finals, and a final. The competition was run in three regions (Northern, Central, Southern) until the semi-finals, from which stage the draw was open. In all, 39 teams entered the competition.

The 2014 final
The 2014 final was played between two Auckland teams, Glenfield Rovers and Forrest Hill-Milford United. It was played at QBE Stadium before the men's Chatham Cup final. Glenfield Rovers came back from behind to beat Forrest Hill-Milford United 3–2, claiming their second title in four years.

Results
All results are taken from the following sources: The Ultimate New Zealand Soccer Website, New Zealand Football and Capital Football Season Review.

Qualifying round

Round 1
All results are taken from the following sources: The Ultimate New Zealand Soccer Website, New Zealand Football and Capital Football Season Review.

Northern Region

Central/Capital Region

Mainland Region

All teams listed below received byes to the second round.
Northern Region: Forrest Hill Milford, Western Springs, Lynn Avon United, Fencibles United, Hibiscus Coast
Central/Capital Region: Valeron Wanderers, Lower Hutt City, Massey University, Victoria University, North Wellington, Waterside Karori
Southern Region: Queenstown Rovers, Dunedin Technical, Roslyn Wakari, Southend United
All teams listed below received byes to the third round.
Northern Region: Claudelands Rovers, Eastern Suburbs, Three Kings United, Glenfield Rovers

Round 2
All results and dates are taken from the following sources: The Ultimate New Zealand Soccer Website, New Zealand Football and Capital Football Season Review.

Northern Region

Central/Capital Region

Mainland

Southern Region

Round 3
All results and dates are taken from the following sources: The Ultimate New Zealand Soccer Website, New Zealand Football and Capital Football Season Review.

Northern Region

Central/Capital Region

Mainland

Southern Region

Quarter-finals
All results and dates are taken from the following sources: The Ultimate New Zealand Soccer Website, New Zealand Football and Capital Football Season Review.

Semi-finals
All results and dates are taken from the following sources: The Ultimate New Zealand Soccer Website, New Zealand Football and Capital Football Season Review.

Final

References

External links
Women's knockout cup section on the New Zealand Football website
Highlights of the final from NZ Herald

Women's Knockout Cup/Kate Sheppard Cup
Women's Knockout Cup
Women's Knockout Cup
Women's Knockout Cup
football